Marko Nešić may refer to:

 Marko Nešić (born 1976), Serbian conductor and composer
 Marko Nešić (born 1872) (1872–1938), Serbian composer and musician